Carei (/) is a city in Satu Mare County, northwestern Romania, near the border with Hungary. The city administers one village, Ianculești.

History 

The first mention of the city under the name of "Karul" dates from 1320, and as "Károly" in 1325, however, the city is known to have existed since 1264, as it was the domain of the Kaplony clan and the center of the Károlyi family's personal domain that settled in the region shortly after the arrival of the Hungarians. The name of the city comes from the word "karul" (in modern Hungarian "karvaly"). The etymology of the word can be traced back to the ancient Turkish language, the word meaning sparrow. Another theory is that the city was named after the Károlyi family. 

King Louis I of Hungary permitted the organization of weekly market gatherings on Saturdays in Carei in 1346, as a result of the military achievements of the Károlyi family. The development of regional trade in the region stimulated the development of the town, and in 1387, King Sigismund elevates the town to county center, while also granting it independent jurisdiction.

In 1482, Ladislau Károlyi, with the permission of King Matthias, begins the construction of a stone residence. Over the course of the following decades, due to fears of an Ottoman attack, the residence will gradually get transformed into a fortification outfitted with a moat, four corner bastions and shooting niches for cannons.

After the Battle of Mohács in 1526, the town falls under the Eastern Hungarian Kingdom, a vassal state of the Ottoman Empire, and in the ensuing struggle between the Habsburg Ferdinand I and John Zápolya for the crown of Hungary, the Karolyi family initially sides with Zápolya, and Ferdinand confiscates their holdings in 1558, however, he reinstates them to power later. By 1554, the city was converted to Protestantism, and by 1567 it adhered to the Calvinist faith. In 1590, a synod takes place in the city, protesting the adoption of the Gregorian calendar in Hungary. Additional synods take place in 1591 and 1594, and the city is the birthplace of Gáspár Károli, who is the first person to translate the Bible into Hungarian in 1586.

In 1592, the baron, Mihály Károlyi, further expands the fortifications of the city, these being made out of predominantly dirt. However, after an Ottoman response, the city is forced to keep paying tribute. Thanks to its strategic position, the city becomes part of a series of fortifications built against the Ottomans, and to be able of repelling the eventual attacks, the fortifications are enlarged again between 1661 and 1666, as well as a German garrison with artillery being assigned. However, after a series of attacks, the city is burned and suffers grave damage, but is eventually rebuilt by the year 1678.

The city will once again come under fire during Francis II Rákóczi's uprising, and the city will be depopulated and left impoverished. The city will have a resurgence after Treaty of Szatmár is signed and the Károlyi family is elevated to the status of counts. Count Alexander Karolyi, shortly after the war, begins colonizing the region with Swabians, inviting 124 families from Württemberg. Eventually Slovaks, Jews, and Rusyns also get settled in the regions. The colonization efforts become more significant during Francis Károlyi tenure, an additional 132 families are settled in 1762, with the total number reaching an estimated 466 Swabian families, forming two districts in the town. Effects on cultural and social life began to show: in 1727 the Piarist Gymnasium was established, in 1754 the first typography was built, and in 1756 a pharmacy was opened.

In 1780, the city became the seat of Szatmár County, and in 1828 the population reached 11,000. The town was hit by an earthquake in 1834, and the majority of the city was destroyed the next year during a great fire, which destroyed 350 houses. The city was hit by a similar great fire on 6 May 1887, causing similar damage to the fire from 1835. The rebuilding of the houses and the organizing of the streets were done according to the planning regulations adopted by the town's council, and they still define the physiognomy of the city's center today. In 1871, the railway connecting Carei to Satu Mare and Debrecen was opened, and it was further expanded in 1887 with the line Tășnad-Sărmășag-Zalău, and in 1905 the railway towards Mátészalka was built. Over the course of the 19th century, the colonized families started adopting the Hungarian language but kept their religion, differentiating them from the reformed majority of the county.

In 1845, with help from count György Károlyi, a hospital was built and opened. With the new railway built in 1887, the light industry and the food industry in the city started blooming, and a new paper mill was also built. Between the years 1893 and 1896, at the behest of count Stephen Károlyi, the castle underwent change once more, according to the plans of the architect Arthur Meinig, and it reached its current form. In 1904, electricity was introduced in the city, and until 1914, multiple elementary and general schools were opened, the most renowned being the Piarist school, today known as Școală Gimnazială Vasile Lucaciu (the Vasile Lucaciu school). In 1910, the train station was built, and it still exists today.

After the collapse of Austria-Hungary at the end of World War I, and the declaration of the Union of Transylvania with Romania, the Romanian Army took control of Carei on April 19, 1919, during the Hungarian–Romanian War. The city officially became part of the territory ceded to the Kingdom of Romania in June 1920 under the terms of the Treaty of Trianon. In August 1940, under the auspices of Nazi Germany, which imposed the Second Vienna Award, Hungary retook the territory of Northern Transylvania (which included Carei) from Romania. Towards the end of World War II, however, the city was taken back from Hungarian and German troops by Romanian and Soviet forces on 25 October 1944, during the Battle of Carei. In memory of this battle, the "Monument of the Romanian Soldier" was erected in the center of Carei; inaugurated in 1964, it is the work of the sculptor Gheza Vida. The 25th of October has been celebrated since 1959 as the Day of the Romanian Armed Forces.

Although between 1760 and 1920 the town was the seat of Szatmár County, the industrial development was not significant and it basically preserved its agricultural specificity until about 1960. In 1926 Carei was attached to Sălaj County. After 1950, Carei was included in the Baia Mare Region, while after 1968, along with the administrative-territorial reorganization of the country, it returned to Satu Mare County.

Until World War II, the industry of the town consisted of mills, the oil factory Ardealul, a station for collecting and fermenting tobacco, and some small workshops. During the Communist period, Carei gradually turned into an industrial town.

Geography
Communes that are near Carei include Căpleni, Urziceni, Foieni, Sanislău, Petrești, Tiream, Căuaș, and Moftin.

Tourism

The Károlyi Castle

Built originally as a fortress around the 14th century, it was converted to a castle in 1794, undergoing further transformations during the 19th century.

The Theater
Carei's theater was built in 1907 and was inspired by a project of architect György Kopeczek. The theater was first named after the writer , until the 1920s, when it was renamed Teatrul Carmen Sylva. After 1945 it was renamed again, to Teatrul Popular. In 1953, the theater received a complete overhaul and it was "modernized" both inside and outside.

The Vasile Lucaciu School
The "Vasile Lucaciu" school became a Romanian high-school in 1919. Prior to that, it was a Hungarian high-school. Nowadays it serves as a secondary school.

The Monument of the Romanian Soldier

The Monument of the Romanian Soldier, which commemorates the Battle of Carei of October 1944, is situated in the center of the city. The monument was built by the sculptor Gheza Vida and the architect Anton Dâmboianu. It was inaugurated in 1964, in the presence of the Defense Minister, Leontin Sălăjan. The monument has the following inscription: "Glory to the soldiers of the Romanian Army, fallen in the struggles for the liberation of the homeland".

The Train Station
The first train station was built in 1871, when the Debrecen–Satu Mare railway was built. The Carei–Zalău railway was inaugurated on 23 December 1887. The building of today's train station was built between 1910 and 1912. During World War II the train station was heavily bombarded, but the damage it suffered was rapidly repaired.

Demographics

According to the 2011 census, Carei had a population of 21,112; out of those, 51.9% were Hungarian, 38.3% were Romanian, 2.3% were German, and 2.2% were Roma. As to religion, 36% of the commune population were Roman Catholic, 32% of them were Romanian Orthodox and 20% were Reformed (Calvinist).

Notable residents

Politics
 Sándor Károlyi de Nagykároly (1668–1743), Hungarian aristocrat, statesman and Imperial Feldmarschall
 Salvator Cupcea (1908–1958), Romanian psychologist, physician, and political figure
 Oszkár Jászi (1875–1957), Hungarian Jewish social scientist, historian, and politician

Religion
 Gáspár Károli (1529–1591), Hungarian Calvinist pastor, translator (first translation of the Bible to Hungarian in 1586)
 Jenő Schönberger (1959–), Hungarian cleric, bishop of the Roman Catholic Diocese of Satu Mare
 Vasile Hossu (1919 – 1997), Romanian Greek Catholic hierarch
 Alexander Ratiu (1916–2002), Romanian-American priest of the Romanian Greek-Catholic Church
 Yosef Leifer (1891–1966), founder and first Rebbe of the Pittsburg Hasidic dynasty
 Avraham Abba Leifer (1918–1990), second Rebbe of the Pittsburg Hasidic dynasty
 Joel Teitelbaum (1887–1979), founder and first Grand Rebbe of the Satmar dynasty

Sports
 Miklós Bródy (1877–1949), Hungarian-Romanian chess master
 Eric Bicfalvi (1988–), Hungarian-Romanian footballer
 Adrian Sălăgeanu (1983–), Romanian footballer
 Dionisiu Bumb (1973–), Romanian footballer
 Szabolcs Perényi (1982–), Romanian-born Hungarian footballer
 Silviu Lung (1956–), Romanian footballer
 Florin Fabian (1974–), Romanian footballer
 Cornel Pavlovici (1942–2013), Romanian footballer
 István Kovács (1984 –), Romanian football referee
 Iosif Budahazi (1947–),Romanian fencer
 Tünde Vaszi (1972–), Romanian long jumper

Others
 Margit Kaffka (1880–1918), Hungarian female writer and poet
 Antal Ligeti (1823–1890), Hungarian landscape painter
 Ferdinánd Barna (1825–1895), Hungarian linguist, translator and librarian of the Hungarian Academy of Sciences

International relations

Twin towns – Sister cities
Carei is twinned with:
 Dębica, Poland
 Orosháza, Hungary since 1991
 Mátészalka, Hungary
 Nyírbátor, Hungary since 2000

Climate
Carei has a continental climate, characterized by hot dry summers and cold winters. As the city is in the far north of the country, winter is colder than the national average.

Gallery

References

External links 

 Official site of Carei 
 Nagykárolyi Napló 

 
Cities in Romania
Populated places in Satu Mare County
Hungary–Romania border crossings
Károlyi family
Shtetls